Lealamanua is a surname. Notable people with the surname include:

Kas Lealamanua (born 1976), Samoan rugby union player
Ruta Lealamanua (born 1974), New Zealand softball player
Tolotear Lealamanua (born 1983), Australian volleyball player

Samoan-language surnames